The 1998–99 season was Olympiacos's 40th consecutive season in the Alpha Ethniki and their 74th year in existence. The club were played 2nd consecutive season in the UEFA Champions League. In the beginning of the summertime Olympiacos named Bosnian Dusan Bajevic coach.

Squad

Competitions

Alpha Ethniki

League standings

Results summary

Results by round

Results

Match dates not available
Olympiacos - AEK 0-0
Olympiacos - Apollon Athens 0-0
Olympiacos - Aris 1-0
Olympiacos - Ethnikos Asteras 4-2
Olympiacos - Ethnikos 2-0
Olympiacos - Ionikos 2-0
Olympiacos - Iraklis 3-2
Olympiacos - Kavala 4-1
Olympiacos - OFI Crete 3-0
Olympiacos - Panathinaikos 0-0
Olympiacos - Panelefsiniakos 1-1
Olympiacos - Paniliakos 3-0
Olympiacos - Panionios 5-0
Olympiacos - PAOK 2-1
Olympiacos - Proodeftiki 6-1
Olympiacos - Skoda Xanthi 3-1
Olympiacos - Veria F.C. 5-0

AEK - Olympiacos 2-0
Apollon Athens - Olympiacos 2-5
Aris - Olympiacos 1-0
Ethnikos Asteras - Olympiacos 1-3
Ethnikos - Olympiacos 0-3
Ionikos - Olympiacos 1-3
Iraklis - Olympiacos 0-2
Kavala - Olympiacos 0-2
OFI - Olympiacos 1-2
Panathinaikos - Olympiacos 2-4
Panelefsiniakos - Olympiacos 0-2
Paniliakos - Olympiacos 1-0
Panionios - Olympiacos 1-4
PAOK - Olympiacos 1-3
Proodeftiki - Olympiacos 0-1
Skoda Xanthi - Olympiacos 0-2
Veria - Olympiacos 0-3

Greek Cup

Olympiacos won the Greek Cup during the season and defeated Panathinaikos

First leg: Olympiacos: 3-1 (first leg), 0-1 second leg
Semi-finals: Panathinaikos 6-1 (first leg), 2-2 (second leg)
Finals: Olympiacos 2-0 Athens, played on May 5, 1999

UEFA Champions League

Second qualifying round

All times at CET

Group stage

All times at CET

Knockout stage

Quarter-finals

All times at CET

Team kit

|

|

References

External links 
 Official Website of Olympiacos Piraeus 

Olympiacos F.C. seasons
Olympiacos
Greek football championship-winning seasons